UML (Unified Modeling Language) is a modeling language used by software developers. UML can be used to develop diagrams and provide users (programmers) with ready-to-use, expressive modeling examples. Some UML tools generate program language code from UML. UML can be used for modeling a system independent of a platform language. UML is a graphical language for visualizing, specifying, constructing, and documenting information about software-intensive systems. UML gives a standard way to write a system model, covering conceptual ideas.  With an understanding of modeling, the use and application of UML can make the software development process more efficient.

History

UML has applied to various activities since the second half of the 1990s and been used with object-oriented development methods.

Fields applying UML
UML has been used in following areas 

Enterprise information systems
Banking and financial services
Telecommunications
Defense

Transportation 
Retail
Science and Research
Distributed Web-based services

UML can also be used to model nonsoftware systems, such as workflow in the legal systems, medical electronics and patient healthcare systems, and the design of hardware.

Modeling applications of UML using various diagrams
The following lists of UML diagrams and functionality summaries enable understanding of UML applications in real-world examples.

Structure diagrams and their applications 
Structuring diagrams show a view of a system that shows the structure of the objects, including their classifiers, relationships, attributes and operations:
Class diagram
Component diagram
Composite structure diagram
Deployment diagram
Object diagram
Package diagram
Profile diagram

Behaviour diagrams and their applications
Behaviour diagrams are used to illustrate the behavior of a system, they are used extensively to describe the functionality of software systems. Some Behaviour diagrams are:

 Activity diagram
 State machine diagram
 Use case diagram

Interaction diagrams and their applications
Interaction diagrams are subset of behaviour diagrams and emphasize the flow of control and data among the things in the system being modelled:
Communication diagram
Interaction overview diagram
Sequence diagram
Timing diagram

Web applications
Web applications of UML can be used to model user interfaces of web applications and make the purpose of the website clear.
Web applications are software-intensive systems and UML is among the efficient choice of languages for modeling them. Web software complexity of an application can be minimized using various UML tools.

UML-based web engineering aims at offering a UML profile that matches the needs of web development better. The following are examples:            
Representation of web applications using a set of models 
Web app use case model 
Web app implementation model 
Web app deployment model 
Web app security model 
Web app site map
To model pages, hyperlinks, and dynamic content on the client and server side.
For modeling server side aspects of web page with one class and client side aspect with another and distinguishing the two by using UML's extension mechanism to define stereotype's and icons for each server and client page.
Stereotypes in UML are used to define new semantics for modeling element.
Forms in HTML can also be modeled using various UML constructs.
UML can be used to express the execution of the system’s business logic in those Web-specific elements and technologies.

Embedded systems

Software in embedded systems design needs to be looked carefully for software specification and analysis. Unified Modeling Language and extension proposals in the realtime domain can be used for the development of new design flows. UML can be used for specification, design and implementation of modern embedded systems. UML can also be used for modelling the system from functional requirements through executable specifications and for that purpose it is important to be able to model the context for an embedded system – both environmental and user-driven.

Some key concepts of UML related to embedded systems:
UML is not a single language, but a set of notations, syntax and semantics to allow the creation of families of languages for particular applications.
Extension mechanisms in UML like  profiles, stereotypes, tags, and constraints can be used for particular applications.
Use-case modelling to describe system environments, user scenarios, and test cases.
UML has support for object-oriented system specification, design and modelling.
Growing interest in UML from the embedded systems and realtime community.
Support for state-machine semantics which can be used for modelling and synthesis.
UML supports object-based structural decomposition and refinement.

A specific UML profile, called MARTE for Modeling and Analysis of Real-Time and Embedded systems, provides some extensions dedicated to the domain.

See also
Unified Modeling Language
Web application
Embedded system
MARTE
UML tools

References and notes
Notes

Citations

External links
 http://www.uml.org/
 https://web.archive.org/web/20110906042707/http://www.itmweb.com/essay546.htm
 https://web.archive.org/web/20120331162632/http://oss.org.cn/ossdocs/development/rup/webapps.htm
 http://www.sereferences.com/uml-tools.php
 http://blogs.oracle.com/JavaFundamentals/entry/the_importance_of_using_unified

Unified Modeling Language